In order to protect infants and children from serious infectious diseases, the Department of Health of Hong Kong provides a free comprehensive childhood immunisation programme to Hongkongers over all the Maternal & Child Health Centres. For primary 1 and primary 6 students, Department of Health dispatches immunisation teams to schools for the required vaccinations.

References
http://www.fhs.gov.hk/english/main_ser/child_health/child_health_recommend.html
http://www.fmshk.org/database/articles/005sf1.pdf
https://web.archive.org/web/20140724211757/http://www.fhs.gov.hk/english/main_ser/child_health/files/record_card.pdf
Basic Principles in Biology (book 3), Y.K.To 
Advanced-level Biology for Hong Kong (volume 4), Y.K.Ho 

Health in Hong Kong